Mandy Boyd (born 15 October 1991) is a New Zealand international lawn bowls player.

Bowls career
Mandy followed her sister Angela Boyd into the sport, and started playing in 2006 while at Napier Girls' High School.

Boyd competed at the 2014 Commonwealth Games as part of the women's triples and women's fours teams. She won a bronze medal in the women's fours events along with teammates Selina Goddard, Amy McIlroy and Val Smith.

She was selected as part of the New Zealand team for the 2018 Commonwealth Games on the Gold Coast in Queensland.

In addition to her international success she has won the 2015 & 2016 pairs titles with her sister and six 'fours' titles (2011, 2014, 2016, 2018, 2019, 2021) at the New Zealand National Bowls Championships when bowling for the Burnside Bowls Club.

References

External links
Mandy Boyd at Bowls New Zealand

1991 births
Living people
New Zealand female bowls players
Commonwealth Games bronze medallists for New Zealand
Bowls players at the 2014 Commonwealth Games
Commonwealth Games medallists in lawn bowls
People educated at Napier Girls' High School
20th-century New Zealand women
21st-century New Zealand women
Medallists at the 2014 Commonwealth Games